Jordan Williamsz (born 21 August 1992) is an Australian middle-distance runner who competes primarily in the 1500 metres. He represented his country at the 2017 World Championships narrowly missing the final. He runs at Melbourne track club with other good runners.

International competitions

Personal bests
Outdoor
800 metres – 1:46.77 (Dublin 2014)
1000 metres – 2:19.18 (Linz 2014)
1500 metres – 3:36.74 (Swarthmore 2012)
One mile – 3:56.89 (Birmingham 2017)
3000 metres – 8:13.75 (Melbourne 2011)
5000 metres – 14:18.05 (Geneva, OH 2016)
5 kilometres – 14:12 (Noosa 2017)
10 kilometres – 30:18 (Melbourne 2018)
Indoor
1500 metres – 3:43.85 (New York 2016)
One mile – 4:00.18 (State College 2014)
3000 metres – 7:59.00 (University Park 2016)

References

1992 births
Living people
Australian male middle-distance runners
World Athletics Championships athletes for Australia
Athletes (track and field) at the 2018 Commonwealth Games
Commonwealth Games competitors for Australia
Athletes from Melbourne
Villanova Wildcats men's track and field athletes
People from the City of Knox